was a Japanese boxer who competed in the 1928 Summer Olympics.

In 1928 he was eliminated in the quarter-finals of the welterweight class after losing his fight to the upcoming bronze medalist Raymond Smillie.

External links
profile

References

1906 births
1980 deaths
Welterweight boxers
Olympic boxers of Japan
Boxers at the 1928 Summer Olympics
Japanese male boxers
20th-century Japanese people
People from Ōta, Tokyo
People from Tokyo
Sportspeople from Tokyo